Stridulum may refer to:

 Stridulum, a 1979 Italian-US film released in English as The Visitor
 Stridulum (EP), a 2010 EP by Zola Jesus
 Stridulum II, a 2010 album by Zola Jesus, an expansion of the EP